Guru Ghasidas (18 December 1756 – 1850), was guru (spiritual teacher) of the Satnampanth in the early 19th century. It was Guru Ghasidas started preaching in a deep forested part of Chhattisgarh.

Ghasidas was born on 18 December 1756 at the Giroudpuri village of Nagpur (present-day village of Giraudpuri at Baloda Bazar of Chhattisgarh) into a Chamar  family. Guru Ghasidas was the son of Mahangu Das and Amrautini Mata. Ghasidas preached Satnam particularly for the people of Chhattisgarh. After Guru Ghasidas, his teachings were carried on by his son, Guru Balakdas. Guru Ghasidas was the founder of the Satnami community in Chhattisgarh. During his lifetime, the political atmosphere in India was one of exploitation. Ghasidas experienced the evils of the caste system at an early age, which helped him to understand the social dynamics in a caste-ridden society and reject social inequality. To find solutions, he travelled extensively across Chhattisgarh.

Guru Ghasidas established Satnami community in Chhattisgarh based on "Satnam" (meaning "Truth") and equality.  Guru Ghasidas created a symbol of truth called "Jai Khamb"  – a white painted log of wood, with a white flag on the top. The structure indicates a white man who follows the truth "satnam" is always steadfast and is the Pillar of Truth (Satya ka Stambh). The white flag indicates peace.

Monuments
The Government of Chhattisgarh renamed a part of Sanjay-Dubri Tiger Reserve after him, that is Guru Ghasidas National Park. They also opened a Central University called "Guru Ghasidas Vishwavidyalaya."

References

Satnami
1756 births
Scholars from Chhattisgarh
1850 deaths
People from Raipur district
18th-century Hindu religious leaders
19th-century Hindu religious leaders
Dalit Hindu saints
Dalit saints